{{DISPLAYTITLE:C2H4F2}}
The molecular formula C2H4F2 (molar mass: 66.05 g/mol, exact mass: 66.0281 u) may refer to:

 1,1-Difluoroethane (or DFE)
 1,2-Difluoroethane (HFC-152)